"Tenderly" is a popular song written by Walter Gross and Jack Lawrence in 1946.

Tenderly may also refer to:

Tenderly (film), a 1968 Italian comedy film
Tenderly (George Benson album), 1989
Tenderly (Joe Maneri album), 1999
Tenderly: An Informal Session, an album by Bill Evans, 2001
Tenderly (Pat Boone album), 1959
"Tenderly" / "Flow", a single by Disclosure, 2012
"Tenderly", a song by Emeli Sandé from Long Live the Angels, 2016

Other uses
Tender (disambiguation)